International Cat Day is a celebration which takes place on 8 August of every year. It was created in 2002 by the International Fund for Animal Welfare. It is a day to raise awareness for cats and learn about ways to help and protect them.

In 2020 custodianship of International Cat Day passed to International Cat Care, a not-for-profit British organization that has been striving to improve the health and welfare of domestic cats worldwide since 1958.

References 

Unofficial observances
August observances
Cats